Gregory Michael "The Bull" Luzinski (born November 22, 1950) is an American former professional baseball player.

Luzinski was the  National League (NL) RBI champion and, in  he was named the recipient of the prestigious Roberto Clemente Award for his involvement in local community affairs. He ended his career playing for the Chicago White Sox. In 1998, Luzinski was inducted into the Philadelphia Phillies Wall of Fame.

Biography
Born in Chicago, Luzinski attended Notre Dame High School in Niles, Illinois. He was drafted by the Philadelphia Phillies with the 11th overall pick in the 1968 MLB draft. He made his MLB debut on September 9, 1970, at age 19, pinch-hitting for the Phillies in a loss to the New York Mets at Shea Stadium.

Playing career
At  and weighing , Luzinski was a well-liked Phillie. He was a poor defensive left fielder but a feared slugger with a good batting average despite frequent strikeouts.  He hit .300 or better for three consecutive seasons during the prime of his career, and was a career .276 hitter, with 307 home runs, and 1,128 RBIs. Luzinski was selected to be a National League (NL) All-Star every year between 1975 and 1978, highlighted by the home run he hit off Jim Palmer in the 1977 All-Star Game. In 1978, Luzinski was the top NL All-Star vote-getter. He was also the National League’s Most Valuable Player (MVP) runner-up in 1975 when he led the National League with 120 RBIs and 322 total bases; and in 1977, when he posted career highs in batting average (.309), home runs (39), and RBIs (130).

He hit safely in every postseason game — and had at least one home run in each of the three National League Championship Series (NLCS)—played by the Phillies from 1976 to 1978, though Philadelphia did not advance to the World Series in any of those years. One of the first Phillies to buy seats at games for impoverished children, Luzinski was honored with the Roberto Clemente Award in 1978. In 1980, he suffered a major slump with injuries in the regular season, batting just .228, with 19 home runs, and 56 RBIs in 106 games, but came back with two game-winning hits in the 1980 National League Championship Series: a two-out two-run home run in the bottom of the 6th inning in Game 1 (the only home run hit in the entire 1980 NLCS); and a pinch-hit RBI double to score Pete Rose in the top of the 10th inning of Game 4, as Philadelphia went on to beat the Houston Astros in five games. Those hits against Houston, the biggest hits of his career, were among the most significant in franchise history; that team went on to bring the Phillies their first world championship, beating the Kansas City Royals in the 1980 World Series, 4 games to 2. At one time, Luzinski held the consecutive-game-hitting streak record for a league championship series with 13.

He joined the Chicago White Sox the next season and became one of the top sluggers and designated hitters in the American League. With the White Sox, he was chosen the Designated Hitter of the Year for 1981 and also in 1983, the season when he set a then-record for most home runs in a season by a designated hitter with 32, and thrice hit the roof of the old Comiskey Park in Chicago.  Luzinski hit five home runs in five consecutive games, a franchise mark, which has since been tied by Ron Kittle, Frank Thomas (twice), Carlos Lee, and Paul Konerko. Luzinski returned to the postseason in the 1983 American League Championship Series, which the Sox lost to Baltimore three games to one.

Luzinski also hit grand slams in two consecutive games in 1984.  Luzinski became a free agent at the end of the 1984 season but chose to retire on February 4, 1985.

Career statistics

Post-retirement
From his retirement from professional baseball in 1985 until 1992, Luzinski was the head baseball coach, and later head football coach, at Holy Cross Academy in Delran Township, New Jersey.

Still a fan favorite in Philadelphia, he started "Bull's Barbecue" in Section 104 at Citizens Bank Park when the Phillies opened the new stadium in 2004. The barbeque stand was inspired by "Boog's BBQ" at Oriole Park at Camden Yards, and Luzinski can usually be found there until after the seventh inning for all Phillies home games.

He lives in Bonita Springs, Florida.

His son, Ryan, was the first-round pick of the Los Angeles Dodgers in the 1992 Major League Baseball draft. Ryan was a promising power hitter when he spurned a letter of intent with the University of Miami to sign with the Dodgers. However, he bounced around the team's farm system until a trade to the Baltimore Orioles in 1997. In eight minor league seasons, he hit .265 with 49 home runs and 296 RBI but could never make the move from AAA to the Majors.

Honors and awards

The Roberto Clemente Award, given annually to a Major League Baseball player who demonstrates sportsmanship and community involvement, was presented to Luzinski in 1978.

In 1989, Luzinski was inducted into the National Polish-American Sports Hall of Fame.

See also
List of Major League Baseball career home run leaders
 List of Major League Baseball career runs batted in leaders
 List of Major League Baseball annual runs batted in leaders

References

External links

Greg Luzinski at SABR (Baseball BioProject)

1950 births
Living people
Baseball players from Chicago
Major League Baseball left fielders
Major League Baseball designated hitters
Philadelphia Phillies players
Chicago White Sox players
Raleigh-Durham Phillies players
Oakland Athletics coaches
National League All-Stars
National League RBI champions
American people of Polish descent
Kansas City Royals coaches
People from Bonita Springs, Florida